The following lists events that happened in 1918 in El Salvador.

Incumbents
President: Carlos Meléndez Ramírez (until December 21), Alfonso Quiñónez Molina (starting December 21)
Vice President: Alfonso Quiñónez Molina (until December 21), Vacant (starting December 21)

Events

December
 21 December – Carlos Meléndez Ramírez resigned as President and was succeeded by Alfonso Quiñónez Molina as Acting President.

References

 
El Salvador
1910s in El Salvador
Years of the 20th century in El Salvador
El Salvador